Fahad Hussain Al-Swailem (born 9 June 1992) is a Saudi footballer who plays as a winger or defender for Saudi Arabian club Al-Washm.

External links
 

1992 births
Living people
Saudi Arabian footballers
People from Riyadh Province
Association football utility players
Al Nassr FC players
Khaleej FC players
Al-Shoulla FC players
Al-Ansar FC (Medina) players
Hetten FC players
Al-Washm Club players
Al-Sharq Club players
Al Jeel Club players
Saudi Professional League players
Saudi First Division League players
Saudi Second Division players